Gongdue Gewog (Dzongkha: དགོངས་འདུས་) is a gewog (village block) of Mongar District, Bhutan.

See also 
Gongduk language

References 

Gewogs of Bhutan
Mongar District